Rip is a surname. Notable people with the surname include:

 Arie Rip (born 1941), Dutch social scientist
 Gerald J. Rip (born 1940), former Chief Justice of the Tax Court of Canada
  (1856–1922), Dutch artist